Kristin Jarmund (born 26 September 1954) is a Norwegian architect. She was educated at the Norwegian Institute of Technology and the Architectural Association School of Architecture. Since 1985, she has run her own company, Kristin Jarmund Arkitekter.

Among the buildings designed by her are Nydalen Station, the head office of the Norwegian Metrology Service, Råholt Lower Secondary School, the Norwegian Embassy in Kathmandu and the Faculty of Odontology at the University of Bergen.

References

1954 births
Living people
20th-century Norwegian architects
Norwegian women architects